Moussa Niakhaté (born 8 March 1996) is a professional footballer who plays as a centre-back for Premier League club Nottingham Forest.

Career
In July 2018, Niakhaté joined 1. FSV Mainz 05 from FC Metz for an undisclosed fee, signing a five-year contract until 2023. On 6 July 2022, Niakhaté signed a three-year deal with Premier League side Nottingham Forest.

Personal life
Born in France, Niakhaté is of Senegalese descent. He is a former youth international for France.

Career statistics

Club

References

External links

Profile at the Nottingham Forest F.C. website

1996 births
Living people
Sportspeople from Roubaix
Association football defenders
French footballers
France under-21 international footballers
France youth international footballers
French sportspeople of Senegalese descent
French expatriate footballers
Valenciennes FC players
FC Metz players
1. FSV Mainz 05 players
Nottingham Forest F.C. players
Ligue 1 players
Ligue 2 players
Bundesliga players
Premier League players
Expatriate footballers in Germany
Expatriate footballers in England
Wasquehal Football players
French expatriate sportspeople in Germany
French expatriate sportspeople in England
Footballers from Hauts-de-France